During the 1999 NATO bombing of Yugoslavia, aerial bombing was carried out against the second largest Yugoslav city of Novi Sad. According to NATO press releases, the bombing targeted oil refineries, roads, bridges, and telecommunications relay stations, facilities which had military uses. The bombing of the city caused great damage to local civilians, including severe pollution and widespread ecological damage as well as lasting consequences for the well-being of the population.

Chronology of the bombing

March 24: NATO bombed a storehouse of the police center in the industrial zone, as well as the "Motins" factory. 

April 1: The old Varadin Bridge on the Danube was destroyed by NATO bombs.
April 3: Liberty Bridge on the Danube was destroyed by NATO bombs. Seven civilians were injured. After the bridge was destroyed, the institute for cardio-vascular diseases in Sremska Kamenica lost its water supply.
April 5: NATO bombed the oil refinery in the industrial zone, as well as Žeželj Bridge on the Danube, which was damaged.
April 7: NATO bombed the oil refinery as well as the residential civilian quarter Vidovdansko Naselje where four civilians were injured and several houses damaged.
April 11: NATO bombed the military object "Majevica" in Jugovićevo.
April 13: NATO bombed the oil refinery.
April 15: NATO bombed the oil refinery and the military object "Majevica" in Jugovićevo.
April 18: NATO bombed the oil refinery which triggered a large fire and much smoke, which caused serious ecological damage. The building of the Government of the Autonomous Province of Vojvodina in the city centre was also hit by NATO bombs.
April 21: NATO bombed the oil refinery and Žeželj Bridge, as well as a bridge near Beška. 

April 22: NATO bombed Žeželj Bridge on the Danube.
April 23: NATO bombed a TV transmitter in wider area of Novi Sad.
April 24: NATO bombed the oil refinery causing fire and smoke. Fruška Gora was also bombed.
April 26: NATO finally managed to destroy Žeželj Bridge, the last bridge on the Danube that the city had. 

April 27: NATO bombed the oil refinery and Fruška Gora.
April 29: NATO bombed the oil refinery and Fruška Gora.
May 1: NATO bombed the oil refinery causing large amounts of smoke that covered the city for several days. Fruška Gora was also bombed.
May 2: NATO bombed the northern suburbs of Novi Sad causing the city to lose its water supply and electricity.
May 3: NATO bombed the buildings of Novi Sad Television in Mišeluk as well as the northern suburbs of the city.
May 6: NATO bombed the military object "Majevica" in Jugovićevo as well as the civilian residential quarter Detelinara damaging residential buildings.
May 7: NATO bombed Iriški Venac and Brankovac on Fruška Gora.
May 8: NATO bombed the military object "Majevica" in Jugovićevo and Fruška Gora.
May 13: NATO bombed the buildings of Novi Sad Television in Mišeluk. Its buildings were heavily damaged as well as neighbouring civilian residential houses. Fruška Gora was also bombed, as well as electric installations in Rimski Šančevi causing the city to lose electricity again.
May 15: NATO bombed Brankovac on Fruška Gora.
May 18: NATO bombed Fruška Gora.
May 20: NATO bombed Fruška Gora.
May 22: NATO bombed Fruška Gora including a TV tower on Iriški Venac.
May 23: NATO bombed Fruška Gora and electric installations in Rimski Šančevi.
May 24: NATO bombed the oil refinery causing smoke that again covered part of the city. Fruška Gora was also bombed.
May 26: NATO bombed buildings of the Novi Sad Television in Mišeluk, as well as Dunavski Kej (Danube Quay) near the city centre. Paragovo, Iriški Venac on Fruška Gora and small barrack in Bukovac were also bombed.
May 29: NATO bombed buildings of the Novi Sad Television as well as the civilian residential quarter Ribnjak where two civilians were badly injured.
May 30: NATO bombed the civilian residential area in Sremska Kamenica near an ambulance where one child was badly injured and two civilian houses were destroyed. The civilian residential area Ribnjak was also bombed as well as buildings of the Novi Sad Television, a tunnel near the previously destroyed Liberty Bridge, a road near the entrance to Sremska Kamenica, part of Fruška Gora between Paragovo and Krušedol, and the northern vicinity of Novi Sad.
May 31: NATO bombed electric installations in Rimski Šančevi causing the city to lose its water supply and electricity. Fruška Gora was also bombed.
June 1: NATO bombed suburban settlements Čenej and Pejićevi Salaši, as well as Fruška Gora.
June 2: NATO bombed Fruška Gora.
June 4: NATO bombed Brankovac and Čot on Fruška Gora.
June 8 and June 9: NATO bombed the oil refinery, one civilian was killed, while two civilians and one child were badly injured. The civilian residential quarter Šangaj was also bombed where one civilian, Milan Bajić (42 years old), was killed and several more civilians were injured, while several civilian houses were destroyed. Although, this was the bloodiest day of the bombing, it was also the last.

Consequences

Impact on civilians
The civilians of Novi Sad were greatly affected by the bombing of their city. The city's oil refinery was bombarded daily, causing severe pollution and widespread ecological damage.

Direct impact
The bombing caused civilian deaths and injuries. Those who were not directly physically harmed suffer from consequences for their physical health caused by ecological damage as well as permanent consequences for psychological health caused by almost 3 months of trauma and fear. Due to the NATO attacks, many in Novi Sad were left jobless.

Notably, NATO were accused of failing to give "effective advance warning" of attacks which may affect civilians, as required by Protocol I. One such attack where NATO was accused of this was the bombing of the Ministry of Education in Novi Sad, premises which administered social welfare programmes.

Impact on infrastructure

The NATO bombing left the city without any of its three Danube bridges, communications, water, and electricity, which severely impaired the day to day living of the residents of Novi Sad. All three bridges have been rebuilt as of 2018 Žeželj Bridge.

Water supplies (including drinking water) for parts of the city were cut off as a result of the bombing. One attack cut off water supplies to 40,000 people in Petrovaradin, and severely disrupted water supplies to 300,000 people in Novi Sad. Services were restored only after two years, partially due to funding from Britain, one of the countries which bombed targets in the city in 1999.

Impact on environment

The bombing of Novi Sad had implications for the environment. A United Nations study (the BTF ‘Industrial Sites’ and ‘Danube’ missions) found that there were serious environmental issues, "requiring immediate action", some of which resulted from the bombing. The bombing of Novi Sad's refinery caused fires which burned 50,000 tons of crude oil, sending toxins and carcinogens into the air and contaminating groundwater. The BTF study was complicated by the heavy pollution that existed before the bombing, with the group noting that "the enforced shutdown of the refinery may even have led to local improvements in the aquatic environment, due to a possible reduction in chronic pollution".

Once all the samples for Novi Sad (Danube Mission) were collated, "based on field observation and results from sample analysis, the BTF concluded that there was no evidence of significant adverse impacts on the Danube aquatic environment as a result of air strikes on Novi Sad refinery. It is thought that most of the oils and oil products released were burned and that no significant volume entered the river".

The BTF study also found that prior to the air strikes, local technicians helped minimise the potential harmful effects of air strikes by "removing oil products that could be harmful to human health if spilt or burnt, such as transformer oil containing PCBs. Production was also accelerated to use up as much as possible of the crude oil, intermediate products and additives, and the final products were shipped to other locations. The remaining oil was mixed with gasoline, so that the tanks would ignite if hit, rather than leak into the soil and groundwater".

Not until 2003, the Danube river was declared clear again. It took four years of work by the Danube Commission to remove the debris of bombed bridges and ordnance. The clearing of the debris was not only important for Novi Sad, but for European states (Hungary & Romania) who were economically impacted by the blockade of river traffic to the Black sea caused by the bombing.

The views of the respective parties

NATO was accused of committing war crimes due to the nature of some of the bombing raids. Some Novi Sad residents found it ironic that Novi Sad was so heavily targeted by NATO due to the fact that during the time of the bombing, the city was ruled by the local Democratic Opposition, which was against the regime in Belgrade. Therefore, some citizens of Novi Sad did not understand why the city was targeted heavily for the events in Kosovo.

A press release one year on from the bombing by then NATO Secretary General Robertson, claims that NATO encountered complications from Yugoslav military use of civilian buildings and human shields. NATO officials have "expressed deep regret at any civilian casualties it caused".

NATO claims that the bombing of targets such as bridges was aimed at impairing the Yugoslav Army's command and control structure. However, the efficacy of the campaign and choice of targets was brought into question by human rights groups, after bridges of no conceivable strategic relevance to the military situation in Kosovo were bombed, including a bridge which led to Hungary, a NATO country. The Movement for the Advancement of International Criminal Law (MAICL) argued that the civilian deaths caused were clearly disproportionate to the military benefits in response to NATO's justification of actions.

See also
Kosovo War

References

External links
 NATO Morning Briefing - 2 May 1999
 NATO Morning Briefing - 3 May 1999
 NATO Briefing - 13 May 1999
 NATO Briefing - 16 May 1999

 Consequences of the bombing - Ekocid 
 Consequences of the bombing - Priča o mostovima 
 Consequences of the bombing - Stambene zgrade 
 Priča o spasavanju 
 United Nations Environment Programme - Balkans Task Force Report

20th century in Novi Sad
Aerial operations and battles of the Kosovo War
1999 in Serbia
NATO airstrikes
Civilian casualties in the Kosovo War
Incidents involving NATO